Tim Colceri (born June 15, 1951) is an American actor and comedian. He is most known for his role in the 1987 Stanley Kubrick film Full Metal Jacket, where he played the door gunner who uttered the much-quoted lines "Get some!" (adopted as the byline for the 2008 movie Tropic Thunder) and "Ain't war hell?" He was originally cast to play Gunnery Sergeant Hartman but was removed from the role in favor of R. Lee Ermey.

Biography

Early life and education
Colceri was born on June 15, 1951, in Canton, Ohio.  When he was two years old, his parents moved to Phoenix, Arizona where he grew up.  At age 18, Tim enlisted in the United States Marine Corps and spent 13 months in Da Nang, Vietnam. He was discharged on his twentieth birthday, and immediately enrolled at Arizona State University, majoring in physical education with his goal of being a wrestling coach.

Career

Colceri became a professional golf player after graduating from college. Three years later, he cut a tendon in his little finger and was forced to find a new profession. He worked at the Victoria Station Restaurant near the Miami airport for three years, then got a job with Braniff Airlines as a flight attendant.

He got into acting through a friend who was taking an acting class and insisted he try acting.

Filmography

 Inside the Love House (1983) - Joe
 Never Too Young to Die (1986) - Grady
 Full Metal Jacket (1987) - Doorgunner
 Emanon (1987) - Construction Worker
 Talent for the Game (1991) - Baseball manager (uncredited)
 Silk Stalkings (1992, TV Series) - Pike
 Who's the Boss? (1992, TV Series) - Construction Worker
 To Protect and Serve (1992) - Franklin
 Slaughter of the Innocents (1993) - Warden Bates
 CIA II: Target Alexa (1993) - CIA Guard
 The Secret World of Alex Mack (1994, TV Series) - Mr. Heller
 Potion d'amour (1994)
 Rage (1995) - Parrish
 Leprechaun 4: In Space (1996) - Metal Head
 Eraser (1996) - Lobby Guard
 Riot (1996) - Garrison
 The Underground (1997) - Palcone
 Against the Law (1997) - Officer I.Q.
Babylon 5: In the Beginning (1998, TV Movie) - Captain Jankowski
 Charades (1998) - Rich man (uncredited)
 Fallen Arches (1998) - Officer Harding
 Ultimate Target (2000) - Bob Weinerman
 Bad Guys (2000) - Special Agent Todd
 Megiddo (2001) - Adm. Hansen
 Reflections of Evil (2002) - Vietnam War Hero
 Soap Girl (2002) - Married Man
 Hitters (2002) - Torillo
 The Gun (From 6 to 7:30 p.m.) (2003) - AJ - Strip Club Owner
 Wounded Love (2004) - Rebecca's father
 Raspberry & Lavender (2004) - Frank Whitworth
 The Last Eve (2005) - Priest
 Razortooth (2006)
 Alibi (2007) - Costello
 Evilution (2008) - Sgt. Gabriel Collins
 Space Girls in Beverly Hills (2009) - Baron Von Benson
 Kimchi Warrior 2D Feast of Fury (2011) - Evil Lord Disease
 The Devil Inside (2012) - Priest
 Garbage (2013) - Associate Producer
 Cry of the Butterfly (2014) - Police Officer
 Retreat! (2016) - Coleman

References

External links

1951 births
Actors from Canton, Ohio
American male film actors
American male television actors
Arizona State University alumni
Living people
Male actors from Phoenix, Arizona
United States Marine Corps personnel of the Vietnam War
United States Marines